Hector Munro or Monro may refer to:
Hector Munro, 13th Baron of Foulis (died 1541), Scottish clan chief
Hector Munro, 17th Baron of Foulis (died 1603), Scottish clan chief
Sir Hector Munro, 1st Baronet (died 1635), Scottish soldier, noble and clan chief
Sir Hector Munro, 2nd Baronet (1635–1651), Scottish noble and clan chief
General Sir Hector Munro, 8th laird of Novar (1726–1805), Scottish noble and ninth Commander-in-Chief of India, 1764–1765
Hector William Munro (1769–1821), British Governor of Trinidad, 1811–1813
Hector Munro (surveyor) (1859–1930), 
Hector Hugh Munro (1870–1916), British writer known by the pen name Saki
Colonel Sir Hector Munro, 11th Baronet (1848–1935), 32nd Chief of Clan Munro
Hector Monro, Baron Monro of Langholm (1922–2006), Scottish Conservative & Unionist Party politician
Hector Munro (cricketer) (1920-2014), English cricketer